Actaeopsis is an extinct genus of crab, containing the single species Actaeopsis whiltshirei from the Lower Cretaceous.

References

External links
 Actaeopsis at the Paleobiology Database

Xanthoidea
Early Cretaceous crustaceans
Prehistoric crustacean genera